A gay anthem is a popular song that has become widely popular among, or has become identified with, the gay community, although some of these songs have also become anthems for the wider LGBT community. Not all songs labelled as "gay anthems" were written intentionally to become gay anthems, but those that do are often marked by themes of perseverance, inner strength, acceptance, pride, and unity. Research in 2007 suggested that the song most commonly identified as a gay anthem is "I Will Survive" by Gloria Gaynor, and described the song as "a classic emblem of gay culture in the post-Stonewall and AIDS eras".

Other classic gay anthems include Village People's "Y.M.C.A.", The Weather Girls's "It's Raining Men", Diana Ross's "I'm Coming Out", and ABBA's "Dancing Queen".

Themes

Although every song is individual, the criteria for what makes a gay anthem has shown a trend among the years. In the 2002 book Queer, the following ten main themes were listed that are common among many, if not all gay anthems:
 Big-voiced divas: Rather than particular to the songs, this area of gay anthems is more akin to a cult of personality of a large gay male following for some particular diva-style pop music vocalists who are almost always black, female gay icons. For example, Gloria Gaynor.
Overcoming hardship in love: Usually a narrative of a wronged lover who comes back stronger than before. For example, "I Will Survive".
You are not alone: Songs about coming together as a community or reassurance to the lonely that there are others like them out there. For example, "We Are Family".
Throw your cares away: A carefree narrative about putting your troubles aside and partying. For example, "Holiday".
Hard-won self-esteem: The theme involves fighting through oppression, darkness, or fear to gain freedom, beauty, or self-esteem. "The Greatest Love of All" as sung by Whitney Houston.
Celebrating unashamed sexuality: The theme is of transcending cultural shame to celebrate one's sexual nature. For example, "It's Raining Men".
Search for acceptance: Songs about a welcoming promised land where the dream of acceptance and belonging and hope lives. For example, "Somewhere (There's a Place for Us)" from West Side Story.
Torch song for the world weary: A narrative about being used, abused, and surviving to tell the tale of lament. For example, "Maybe This Time".
Love conquers all: Tales of not giving up on love despite seemingly insurmountable odds. 
No apologies: The theme revolves around defiantly living one's life despite what others may want. For example, "I'm Coming Out".

Sources of gay anthems 
Madonna's "Vogue", George Michael's Fastlove, Mariah Carey's "Hero", Lisa Stansfield's The Real Thing, Ultra Naté's "Free", Janet Jackson's "Together Again", Cher's "Believe", Mylène Farmer's "Sans Contrefaçon" and "Libertine", Jessica Simpson's "I Think I'm in Love with You" and "A Public Affair", Kylie Minogue's "Spinning Around" and "Can't Get You Out of My Head", Geri Halliwell's "It's Raining Men", Dannii Minogue's "I Begin to Wonder", Melanie C's "Never Be the Same Again" and "Think About It", Tamar Braxton's "Hot Sugar" and "My Man", Lady Gaga's "Born This Way", and Ariana Grande's "Break Free" are considered as gay anthems for the new generation.

Through the first decade of the 21st century, chart-topping popular songs became a "refuge of unambiguous support for gay rights" in a time when legal support for LGBT rights in the US was lagging (Don't Ask, Don't Tell would be repealed in 2011, and same-sex marriage would only be fully legalized in 2015). Even before its single release, Lady Gaga's "Born This Way" was predicted by Elton John to replace Gloria Gaynor's classic gay anthem "I Will Survive". UK LGBT rights charity Stonewall named Christina Aguilera's "Beautiful" the most empowering song of the 2000s decade for LGBT people.

List of historically significant gay anthems

See also 

 LGBT music
 LGBT marketing

Notes

References 

Anthems
LGBT-related music
LGBT-related songs
Gay culture